Bratsigovo Municipality is a municipality in the Pazardzhik Province of Bulgaria.

Demography

At the 2011 census, the population of Bratsigovo was 9,648. Most of the inhabitants (79.31%) were Bulgarians, and there were significant minorities of Gypsies/Romani (4.09%) and Turks (6.73%). 9.55% of the population's ethnicity was unknown.

Communities

Towns
 Bratsigovo

Villages
 Byaga
 Isperihovo
 Kozarsko
 Ravnogor
 Rozovo
 Zhrebichko

References

Municipalities in Pazardzhik Province